Mount Magog is located on the border of Alberta and British Columbia on the Continental Divide in the Canadian Rockies. It also straddles the shared boundary of Banff National Park with Mount Assiniboine Provincial Park. It was named in 1930 after references in the Bible.


Geology
Mount Magog is composed of sedimentary rock laid down from the Precambrian to Jurassic periods. Formed in shallow seas, this sedimentary rock was pushed east and over the top of younger rock during the Laramide orogeny.

Climate
Based on the Köppen climate classification, Mount Magog is located in a subarctic climate with cold, snowy winters, and mild summers. Temperatures can drop below -20°C with wind chill factors below -30°C.

Gallery

See also
 List of peaks on the British Columbia–Alberta border
 List of mountains in the Canadian Rockies

References

Three-thousanders of Alberta
Three-thousanders of British Columbia
Mountains of Banff National Park
Canadian Rockies
Mount Assiniboine Provincial Park